Cocullo is a comune and town in the Province of L'Aquila, located in the Abruzzo region of Italy. As of 2013 its population was of 246.

Geography
The village is situated in the Peligna Valley, between the towns of Avezzano and Sulmona. It is linked with them by the A25 motorway and the Rome-Pescara railway line.

It is a single civil parish (frazione), named Casale and borders with the municipalities of Anversa degli Abruzzi, Bugnara, Castel di Ieri, Castelvecchio Subequo, Goriano Sicoli, Ortona dei Marsi and Prezza.

History
The origins of Cocullo are closely related to the Ancient Roman town of Koukoulon, situated between Cocullo village and Casale.

Snake Festival (Feast of San Domenico)
Cocullo is known for its singular patron saint's holiday, named Festa dei Serpari, in which the patron saint's statue (Domenico di Sora) is transported in procession covered with many snakes (mainly four-lined, aesculapian, grass and green whip snakes). The reptiles themselves are transported in procession by local serpari, a sort of "snake breeders", and released in the surrounding woods at the end of the holiday. The festival, set every first of May since 2012 (in the past it took place every first Thursday in May), is a receptive event for thousands of Italian and foreign visitors. In 2009 it was cancelled due to some structural damages occurred into the village after the L'Aquila earthquake. This tradition, present also in coat of arms symbolism, substituted the ancient Roman mythologic ritual of Angitia, a snake goddess  worshipped by the Marsi.

Photogallery

Notes and references

External links

  Cocullo official website
 Videos and photos of the snake festival and procession in Cocullo
 Feast of San Domenico Italiansrus.com

Cities and towns in Abruzzo